Sharifah Sofia binti Syed Hussein (born 28 July 1985), better known by her popular name Sharifah Sofia, is a Malaysian actress.

Early life
Sofia was born in Liverpool, England, the third child out of four siblings. She is the elder sister of footballer Syed Adney. She grew up in Liverpool until she was 9 years old. She has mixed parentage, her father is Malaysian and mother Scottish. She graduated in 2008 from Sunway University College where she was seeking a degree in performing arts.

Personal life
Sofia married in 2009 but  she and her former husband has divorced in 2019 and now has two children. She also change her style with wearing hijab and now she also learning Islam deeply.

Filmography

Film
 Gong (2006)
 Cinta Yang Satu (2007)
 Orang Minyak (2007)
 Pisau Cukur (2009)
 Berani Punya Budak (2012)

Drama
 Gol & Gincu The Series as season 2 episode 8 guess artist (2007)
 Nur Kasih (2009)

Theatre
 Cupid Kills

Awards and nominations
 19th Malaysian Film Festival - Best Supporting Actress (nominated)

References

External links
 
 Sharifah Sofia at portal
 Sinema Malaysia

1985 births
Living people
21st-century Malaysian actresses
Malaysian television personalities
Malaysian people of Malay descent
Malaysian people of Scottish descent
Malaysian people of Arab descent
Citizens of Malaysia through descent
British emigrants to Malaysia
Malaysian film actresses
Malaysian stage actresses
Malaysian television actresses